Esa Skyttä is a Finnish former racing cyclist. He won the Finnish national road race title in 1995 and 1998.

References

External links

Year of birth missing (living people)
Living people
Finnish male cyclists
Place of birth missing (living people)